The potato fruit is the part of the potato plant that, after flowering, produces a toxic, green cherry tomato-like fruit.

Characteristics
After flowering, potato plants produce small green fruits that resemble green cherry tomatoes, each containing about 300 seeds. Like all other parts of the plant except the tubers, the fruit contain the toxic alkaloid solanine and are therefore unsuitable for consumption. All new potato varieties are grown from seeds, also called "true potato seed", "TPS" or "botanical seed" to distinguish it from seed tubers. New varieties grown from seed can be propagated vegetatively by planting tubers, pieces of tubers cut to include at least one or two eyes, or cuttings, a practice used in greenhouses for the production of healthy seed tubers. Plants propagated from tubers are clones of the parent, whereas those propagated from seed produce a range of different varieties.

Potato fruits are produced when the plants experience cool temperatures and sufficient water. In 2014, many gardeners in Michigan, United States, were alarmed when they found the green fruit which are not normally produced on the potato plant in that region. This was due to the weather in July that year being cooler and wetter than normal, allowing the plants' flowers sufficient time to be pollinated and produce fruit.

In popular culture
Dorothy L. Sayers's short story The Leopard Lady, in the 1939 collection In the Teeth of the Evidence, features a child poisoned by potato berries injected with the alkaloid solanine to increase their toxicity.

References

Fruit
Potatoes